The New Haven Old Black Rugby Football Club is a rugby club in New Haven, Connecticut. They play in Division II of the Empire Rugby Union.

Founded in 1986, they play at Boulevard Field in New Haven. The club's colors are black, green and gold.

History

1980s
Prior to the start of the club in the Spring of 1986, there was no rugby in the Greater New Haven area. A group of Southern Connecticut State University graduates, led by Robert Chester, applied for membership of the NERFU. The NERFU accepted the petition and the club was allowed to play on a probationary basis.

After initially feeling the strain of a minimum of two games a week, Old Black went on to have a highly successful inaugural season, culminating in the win of the Connecticut Cup by upsetting Providence in the final. They were awarded full membership of the NERFU in the Fall of 1986.

1990s
The year 1993 saw a restructuring of the club, owing to the retirement of a number of the club's early members. That season, Old Black returned to Division II, having been promoted to Division I a couple of years earlier. They elected to remain there for the next 10 years, and it was seen as a wise move. In 2002 they won the NERFU Division II title; three years after their return to Division II.

2000s
In 2000 they qualified for the Elite 8 of Division II, followed by a Sweet 16 appearance in 2001. 2002 was the year the club won the national Division II title and was again promoted to Division I, where they played until 2013, where they were assigned to Division II.

Notable former players
 Kahn Fotuali'i, Samoa scrum-half
 Andrew 'Tui' Osborne, Eagles wing/fullback (one cap)
 Jacko Ah Hoy, Eagles sevens

Honors
USA Rugby Division II National Champions:
2002
USA Rugby Division II Elite 8 Appearances:
2000
2002
2014
USA Rugby Division I Sweet 16 Appearances:
2004
2006
2007
2009
USA Rugby Division II Sweet 16 Appearances:
2000
2001
2002
2014
NERFU Division II Champions:
1996
Connecticut Cup:
1986

References

External links
 Official site
 Facebook Page

Rugby clubs established in 1986
1986 establishments in Connecticut
Sports in New Haven, Connecticut
Rugby union teams in Connecticut